"Jane" is the second single released by French rock band Century, from their debut album ...And Soul It Goes. It was released in 1986.
The song did not achieve the same success as their previous single, "Lover Why", but managed to enter the French musical charts, staying in the Top 40 for thirteen weeks.

Track listing
 7 "Single

 12 "Single

 Portugal 7 "Single

Performance in the music charts

References

1986 singles
1986 songs
Century (band) songs
Carrere Records singles